This is a list of islands of Iceland. It includes all islands larger than 1 km2, as well as a number of smaller islands that are considered significant either because they are or used to be inhabited, or for specific historical, geographical or geological reasons. Thousands of other small islands and skerries are found along the coast, especially in Breiðafjörður.

The areas of some of these islands may vary comparatively rapidly due to volcanic activity and subsequent action by the sea. In the case of the groups of islands in Breiðafjörður, no area is listed. This is because measurement of the smaller islands is made difficult by a very large tidal range of up to six metres.

List

See also

Extreme points of Iceland
List of islands in the Atlantic Ocean
List of islands

References

Iceland, List of islands of
 
Islands